Louis-Athanase David (June 24, 1882 – January 26, 1953) was a Canadian lawyer, politician, and businessman. He was a cabinet minister in the Provincial Parliament of Quebec, representing the riding of Terrebonne and serving as Provincial Secretary. He was later a member of the Canadian Senate.

Early life
David was born in Montreal; He was the son of Laurent-Olivier David, a Canadian journalist, lawyer, and politician. He received a law degree from Université Laval and was admitted to the Bar of Quebec in 1905.

Career
David began practising law in 1905, and was a partner in the law firm of Elliott & David. He joined the Liberal party, and was elected to the Legislative Assembly of Quebec in 1916 as the Liberal Party member for the Terrebonne riding, serving until 1936. David directed the Department of Education, and in 1930 he sponsored a controversial bill which would have created a separate Jewish school board in Quebec.

David did not run in the 1936 election, but was elected again in 1939.

David created the Prix Athanase-David literary prize in 1922. In 1923 was made a Knight of the Legion of Honour by the government of France; he was made an Officer in 1925 and a Commander in 1934.
 
A sports fan, David was president of the Montreal Canadiens ice hockey club from 1930 to 1935. The club won three Stanley Cups during his tenure in 1924, 1930, and 1931. In 1928 he partnered with Montreal stockbroker Ernest Savard and American baseball executive George Stallings to revive the Montreal Royals baseball franchise as part of the International League and to build Delorimier Stadium.

David resigned from the provincial government in February 1940 to accept an appointment as Senator in the Parliament of Canada where he served until his death in 1953.

Personal
David was married to Antonia Nantel (known as Madame Athanase David), who was an arts administrator and patron in Montreal. He helped her in establishing the Montreal Symphony Orchestra in 1934 and the Montreal Festivals in 1936. Their son, Paul David, was a cardiologist and later Canadian senator. His granddaughter is Françoise David.

See also 
 List of crossings of the Rivière des Mille Îles

References

External links
 

1882 births
1953 deaths
Businesspeople from Montreal
Canadian senators from Quebec
Chevaliers of the Légion d'honneur
Lawyers from Montreal
Liberal Party of Canada senators
Montreal Canadiens executives
National Hockey League executives
Politicians from Montreal
Quebec Liberal Party MNAs
Stanley Cup champions
Université Laval alumni
Athanase